The Paterson and Hudson River Railroad was a railroad that operated in New Jersey and connected the cities of Jersey City and southeast Paterson. The railroad was started in 1833.

The company was the first in the United States to build moveable bridges for rail, crossing the Passaic River and Hackensack River.

Originally the Paterson and Hudson River Railroad used a troop of horses to pull the cars along the rails. The first steam locomotive to operate on the line was called the McNeil and manufactured by Robert Stephenson and Company then assembled by Rogers Locomotive and Machine Works.

A decade after opening, the railroad's importance increased when the Paterson and Ramapo Railroad was built connecting north Paterson to Suffern, New York just over the state line. The lines were eventually connected. In 1852, the New York and Erie Railroad leased the track rights of the P&HR and P&R and combined their lines into the "Union Railroad", which soon became the new New York and Erie Railroad mainline. Erie took ownership in 1953.

The first stations west of Bergen Junction along the line included "Germantown", "Hackensack" along the Hackensack River (close to the present-day Secaucus Junction and the former Harmon Cove station) and "Boiling Spring" (at the site of the present-day Rutherford station).

See also 
 Timeline of Jersey City area railroads

References 

Defunct New Jersey railroads
Railway companies established in 1833
Railway companies disestablished in 1852
Defunct public transport operators in the United States
Predecessors of the Erie Railroad
American companies established in 1833